Buccleuch County is one of the 141 Cadastral divisions of New South Wales. It contains the locality of Adjungbilly. The Murrumbidgee River is at the northern boundary, with the Goodradigbee River on the eastern boundary, and the Tumut River on the western boundary. It includes the northern part of the Kosciuszko National Park.

Buccleuch County was named in honour of the Duke of Buccleuch (1806-1884).

Parishes within this county
A full list of parishes found within this county; their current LGA and mapping coordinates to the approximate centre of each location is as follows:

References

Counties of New South Wales